"À l'ammoniaque" is a song by French rap duo PNL. It was released on 22 June 2018 as the debut single from their third studio album Deux frères. The song peaked atop the charts of France.

Music video
The accompanying music video, directed by Kamerameha, Mess and Kim Chapiron, was filmed in South Africa and was premiered through PNL's official YouTube channel on 22 June 2018.

Charts

Certifications

References 

2018 singles
2018 songs
French-language songs
PNL (rap duo) songs
SNEP Top Singles number-one singles